Sri Lanka Railways Class S11 is a diesel multiple-unit (DMU) train, built for Sri Lanka Railways by Integral Coach Factory and imported through RITES Ltd, an Indian state infrastructure corporation on a line of credit extended by the Indian Government.  They were built to replace locomotive-hauled passenger trains.  Twenty S11 DMUs were ordered to strengthen long-distance travel on the Coastal Line from Colombo to Matara.

History

Conception 
The railway decided to add the DMUs to its service as part of its Coastal line's upgrade project, where track was upgraded to improve speed.  The DMUs were built by Integral Coach Factory, to replace locomotive-hauled passenger trains.

Inauguration into service 
The trains were inaugurated into the railway service on 11 March 2011, with a ceremony at Matara Railway Station.  According to a press release from the Indian High Commission in Sri Lanka, twenty DMUs are being supplied to Sri Lanka Railways in phases till March 2012.

One of the DMUs faced technical problems on the Galle – Matara section.  During the journey, the train came to an abrupt halt due to an electrical short-circuit and resumed its journey after 20 minutes when the fault was set right.  The Sri Lankan Railway suspended further import of the DMUs.  In April 2011, the suspension was revoked, after a team from RITES inspected them and declared that the faults were due to an electrical failure caused by tinkering and the DMU running with more coaches than it was designed for.

Alawwa Crash 

 2011 Alawwa rail accident –  On 17 September 2011, near Alawwa, two trains (a locomotive-hauled train and an S11 DMU No. 899) collided, killing 3 people and injuring 20.  The S11 ran into the rear observation car of the train ahead.

Pothuhera Crash 

On 31 May 2014 a north bound Deyata Kirula intercity express train hauled by S11 - 902 and the Colombo bound Rajarata Rejini train hauled by Class M2 - 570 collided together in the Pothuhera railway station near Kurunegala injuring 68 people and causing serious damages to the both trains and the track. This has been considered as the most damage valued accident for Sri Lanka Railways

Operations 
The S11 DMUs are primarily operated on the Coastal line, connecting Colombo, Galle, and Matara.  The sets are used on the Ruhunu Kumari, Vavniya ICE and several other suburban trains. Apart from the single instance of a 20-minute failure on the Galle – Matara section, there has been no other failure of the DMUs. Other than on Coastal Line, one DMU is running express on Puttalam Line where it only stops at Negombo and 7 other stations up to Chilaw after Dematagoda.

Current fleet details

Gallery

See also 

Sri Lanka Railways

References 

S11
Train-related introductions in 2011